Nicolas Maury (born 14 October 1980 in Saint-Yrieix-la-Perche, Haute-Vienne) is a French actor and filmmaker. He is most noted for his regular role as Hervé in the television series Call My Agent! (Dix pour cent), and his directorial debut film My Best Part (Garçon chiffon), which was a César Award nominee for Best First Feature Film at the 46th César Awards in 2021.

Maury had his first acting role in Patrice Chéreau's 1998 film Those Who Love Me Can Take the Train (Ceux qui m'aiment prendront le train).

He is out as gay. He served as the president of the Queer Palm jury at the 2021 Cannes Film Festival, and stated his support for the program becoming an official festival award.

Filmography

References

External links

1980 births
Living people
20th-century French male actors
21st-century French male actors
French male film actors
French male stage actors
French male television actors
French film directors
French gay actors
LGBT film directors
People from Haute-Vienne